Sarrasani is a German circus that reached world fame before World War II and was resident in Dresden, but also became known as the national circus of Argentina during the years of German separation.

Sarrasani was founded by Hans Stosch, a clown with the stage name Giovanni Sarrasani, who was born 1873 in Poznań. Stosch came 1901 to Radebeul near Dresden and the circus had its official premiere 1902 in Meißen. In the year 1912 a stationary circus building opened, which was designed by Max Littmann for Sarrasani. The circus often performed abroad and reached world fame. Its well-known labels were the elephants, but the circus was also known for the Sioux, who were employed from the early years.

From 1923 to 1925 Sarrasani went on its first tour through South America. In these years, Stosch-Sarrasani also introduced innovative marketing concepts and wrote fictive adventure stories Fahrten und Abenteuer, Mit Sarrasani in Südamerika. Totally, about 10 million copies of these booklets were distributed.

After the death of Hans Stosch-Sarrasani Sr., his son Hans Stosch-Sarrasani Jr. took directorship. He was followed by his widow, Trude Stosch-Sarrasani, in 1941. The Sarrasani theater was destroyed on 13 February 1945 during the Bombing of Dresden in World War II. Trude Stosch-Sarrasani emigrated to Argentina, where she reestablished the circus in Buenos Aires as the "Circo Nacional Argentino."

The Argentine writer Gustavo Bernstein tells the story in the book Sarrasani, between the fable and the epic  (Biblos, 2000), a fictionalized chronicle in which he accompanies the course of the mythical circus between Europe and America in the context of the sociopolitical events of the last century. The book distinguishes three aesthetic stages in the history of the circus, according to the conduction led by its founder Hans Stosch-Sarrasani (Senior), his son Hans Stoch-Sarrasani son (Junior) or his wife Trude Stoch-Sarrasani.

History 

The story has two basic topics. On one side, a tale about a family of circus directors struggling to remain at the top of show business in the social context of Europe and South-America during the last century. On the other side, the epical facts of a colossal enterprise that survived the most transcendental political crisis, dealing – voluntarily or by force – with political leaders, dictators, bankers or businessmen from both continents.

The Sarrasani Circus was founded in 1901, reaching a patrimony of 400 animals (not pets, precisely) and hiring a similar number of artists and technicians, hosting troupes from the most distant and exotic places: Chinese, Japanese, Javanese, Moroccan, Hindus, Sioux, Ethiopians, Gauchos, Europeans, etc. Within this complex megalopolis, the Circus managed to sail through turbulent periods of this century emerging unharmed. Among them: World War I, the 1930s crisis, the Nazism, World War II, Joseph Stalin's troops arriving to Eastern Germany, the zenith of Peronism in Argentina and several coups d'état in different countries. During the second Peronist period in Argentina the circus even changed its name to "National Circus of Argentina". Only since Germany's re-unification, Sarrasani's name was exalted again after almost a 50 year of proscription. The story is conceived as a road movie where the odyssey of an immense circus, a sort of Noah's Arc of people and animals, is an excuse to travel across two continents in different periods of the last century. A journey in space and time, this chronicle carries its own background of tango, epochal songs and circus orchestras.

Besides the profuse network of historic characters, the tale focuses on three main personalities that were in charge of the circus at different times: Hans Stosch-Sarrasani, alias Senior, Hans Stosch-Sarrasani (son), alias Junior, and Trude, Junior's young wife.

Senior 

Senior, the founder, was a dreamer, a visionary in show-biz obsessed with the idea of greatness, a megalomaniac who only conceived pharaonic projects that, incredibly, worked. His circus turned out to be a crossroad of cultures from all around the five continents and also the state-of-the-art in technology.

Sarranni based his circus in Dresden and it reached a height of popularity there in the late 1920s.  At around the same time, the Karl May Museum opened nearby.

He toured not only around Europe, but also around South America, where he also moved the zoo and all that megalopolis on three enormous ships. Due to his stubborn and independent character, he had several problems with bureaucrats in power and especially with the ascendant Nazi regime that pushed him to emigrate. He established the circus in 1901 and ran it until his death in Sao Paulo, Brazil in 1934.

Junior 
Junior, his son, inherited the great name but also a chaotic financial situation and, even worse, an awful relation with the political authorities of his country. He didn't make big aesthetic changes on the scene but his pragmatic administration and a great sense of reality allowed the circus to cope with the worse crisis since its foundation. He had a special talent for diplomatic treatment with leaders in every country he arrived; he arranged with Joseph Goebbels the return of the circus to Germany for the 1936 Summer Olympics in Berlin. Junior would run the circus during seven years from 1934 to 1941.

Trude 
Trude, Junior's wife, a lovely and angelic young woman, found herself in charge of the circus aged only 28 years, during the Nazi regime. Her approach to running it was notoriously different from her male predecessors: she never commanded or ordered; on the contrary, she always delicately suggested. Minister Goebbels recommended the use of her young and beautiful figure in the circus posters as an icon of the Arian era. In 1944, however, she was sent to prison accused of anti-Germanic behavior. Two weeks later, Trude was released to continue performing, while Germany was immersed in the open war. Her partner, the Hungarian acrobat Gabor Némedy, was kept prisoner as a way of persuasion. In 1945, during the show, she was caught in the bombing of Dresden, from which she fortunately emerged alive.

After the war, she started over as an equestrian artist working for other circus. In 1948, an Argentine producer invited her to reestablish Sarrasani in Buenos Aires with the presence of President Juan Perón and his wife, Evita, and began a very close relationship with them. Trude ran the circus until the mid seventies, albeit as a smaller enterprise. The popularity of cinema and TV, together with new cultural codes for animal care and use, led the circus to adapt to modern times.

Trude Stosch-Sarrasani spent her last days in San Clemente del Tuyú (a seaside resort town south of Buenos Aires) with Kiki, a little dog picked up from the street. Ms. Stosch-Sarrasani died there on June 6, 2009, at the age of 96.

References

Literature 
 Bernstein, Gustavo. Sarrasani, entre la fábula y la epopeya. Editorial Biblos. 2000. .
 Stosch-Sarrasani, Hans: Durch die Welt im Zirkuszelt. Berlin Schützen-Verl. 1940.
 Hahnke, Gustav von: Zirkus Sarrasani. Hinter den Kulissen einer Weltschau. Berlin u.a. Schmidt. 1952
 Günther, Ernst: Sarrasani, wie er wirklich war. 3., erg. und erw. Aufl. Berlin Henschel. 1991
 Günther, Ernst: Der lachende Sarrasani. Anekdoten aus der Welt eines berühmten Zirkus. Husum-Dr.- und Verl.-Ges. 1992
 Günther, Ernst: Sarrasani. Geschichte und Geschichten. Dresden Saxo-Phon. 2005.

External links 
 (de)Official website
 Circus Sarrasani on Circopedia.org
 Sarrasani, testigo de un siglo
 Murió Trude Sarrasani, una auténtica leyenda del circo
 Gertrude Sarrasani y una vida de película
 El circo siempre vuelve
 SARRASANI. El circo regresa 
 Pasión y suerte del circo Sarrasani en Mágicas Ruinas: Crónicas del siglo pasado
 El Sarrasani en el diario argentino Clarín
 Yo tengo un elefante Diario Página 12
 Datos del edificio de 1912-1945 en International Architecture Database
 Circo Sarrasani
 Tango "Justo el 31" de Discépolo
 Un día, un circo *

Circuses
Culture in Dresden